Kavacha is a 2019 Indian Kannada-language action thriller film written and directed by G. V. R. Vasu in his directorial debut. It is the remake of the 2016 Malayalam film Oppam, with changes made in the script to suit the interests of Kannada-speaking audiences. The film stars Shiva Rajkumar, Kruthika Jayakumar, Isha Koppikar, Baby Meenakshi and Vasishta N. Simha. It was released worldwide on 5 April 2019 and got positive reviews from critics.

Plot 
Jayarama is a blind man, who is a part of a large family, and works as a lift operator and caretaker in a apartment building in Bangalore. He takes responsibility to earn money for his sister's wedding and is loyal to Krishnamurthy, a retired Supreme Court Judge who lives in the apartment and accompanies Krishnamurthy on a long search for someone. On one trip, Krishnamurthy tells about the reason behind his search to Jayarama. Years ago, a man named Vasudeva was imprisoned by Krishnamurthy for a crime he did not commit. Although Krishnamurthy knew that Vasu was innocent, he followed the letter of the law. As a result, Vasu's family poisoned themselves, which leaves Vasu insane, and resolves to avenge his loss by warning Krishnamurthy that he will kill him and his family. 

Vasu has been released from prison, and Krishnamurthy feels threatened. Krishnamurthy has a young daughter Nandini, and is afraid that Vasu will kill her if he learns of her existence. To keep her safe, he sent her to a convent school where she knows nothing about him. Nandini's only link to her father is Jayarama, who frequently visits her at Krishnamurthy's request. When Nandini asks Jayarama about her father at each visit, he replies that he will bring him some other day. Krishnamurthy and Jayarama transfer money from the former's bank account to another account, which was opened for Nandini. To reduce scrutiny, they avoid an electronic transfer. 

Jayarama withdraws the money and gives it to Krishnamurthy, who puts the money in a safe in his apartment. A large wedding takes place, to which everyone in the building are invited. Jayarama heads to Krishnamurthy's apartment after the party to find him dead, where he senses the presence of someone in the apartment, where the killer tries to escape, but Jayarama subdues him. After learning Jayarama is blind, Vasu (who is the killer) sneak past him and escapes. In the chaos, Krishnamurthy's money is missing and the cops accuse Jayarama of stealing it. After a cat-and-mouse chase, Vasu kills Krishnamurthy's brother-in-law Natraj and also makes the cops to place murder charges on Jayarama for killing Krishnamurthy and Natraj. 

The cops arrest Jayarama, who pleads for a chance to find the killer. When Jayarama is forced by the cops to accept the blame by attempting to torture his girlfriend Revathi during the interrogation, he angrily fights back and escapes with Revathi. Jayarama tries to hide Nandini from Vasu with the aid of his friend Inspector Gowri. Jayarama reveals to Gowri that Nandini is actually Vasu's daughter, whom the madman is about to kill. Jayarama, Nandini and Gowri hide in the convent under the Mother Superior's supervision. Vasu arrives at the convent and knocks out Gowri. After hearing Vasu's ringtone by calling him, Jayarama shoots him and reveals the truth about Nandini's origin to a dying Vasu. In the end, Jayarama, Revathi and Nandini begin a new life together as a loving family.

Cast 
 Shiva Rajkumar as Jayarama aka Ramappa
 Kruthika Jayakumar as Revathi
 Isha Koppikar as Gowri
 Baby Meenakshi as Nandini
 Vasishta N. Simha as Vasudeva
 Iti Acharya
 Ravi Kale as Inspector Basavaraj
 Rajesh Nataranga
Ramesh Bhat as Jayarama's uncle
Girija Lokesh as Jayarama's aunt
Vishwas Bharadwaj
Srikanth Iyengar as Natraj
Srinivas Prabhu 
Jayaprakash as Krishnamurthy
Laya Kokila as Manja
Tabla Nani as Gurusiddha, Jayarama's friend
 Prakash Thuminad as Balu, Jayarama's friend
Madhu Hegde
K. S. Ravindranath
Malathi Shekhar
Girish Jatti
Krishna Hebbale
Balaraj as Shekhar
Lakshmi Hegde
Ganesh Rao Kesarkar

Production 
In November 2016, Priyadarshan confirmed that a Kannada remake of his Malayalam directorial venture Oppam would star Shiva Rajkumar. The remake, titled Kavacha, is produced by M. V. V. Satyanarayana and A. Sampath under Hayagriva Movie Adishtana, and marks the directorial debut of G. V. R. Vasu. He also worked as screenwriter, working on the screenplay for more than seven months, rewriting it substantially to suit the interests of Kannada-speaking audiences, that included giving more emphasis to the action elements. Baby Meenakshi was chosen to reprise her role from the original. Principal photography began on 23 November 2017, and ended in early August 2018. Shooting took place in Mysore, Ooty, and Bangalore. Rahul Shrivastav was the cinematographer.

Soundtrack 
The soundtrack was composed by Arjun Janya and 4 Musics. Janya composed all songs except "Rekkeya", which 4 Musics composed; that song has two versions, a duet and a solo. The film features a remix of the song "Hosa Belaku Moodutidde" from Hosa Belaku (1982), but that does not appear on the soundtrack.

Release 
Kavacha was released worldwide on 5 April 2019. It was originally scheduled for released on 7 December 2018, but was postponed due to "technical issues" with the sound mixing.

Critical response 
Shyamprasad S of Bangalore Mirror said "Shiva Rajkumar as a blind man delivers a stunning performance" and "Kavacha will remain as one [of] Shiva Rajkumar's best films". Sunayana Surresh of The Times of India called it an emotional tale of revenge that has its moments, especially laudable for the nail-biting climax with both Shivarajkumar and Vasishta N Simha on top of their game. A Sharadhaa of New Indian Express said that in spite of being a remake, what makes Kavacha stands out on its own is the performance by Shivarajkumar – an obvious sign that he has risen to the stature of a realistic actor. Aravind Shwetha of  The News Minute noted that a lot of minor characters from the original have been eliminated for good making it a decent thriller with an exceptional performance by Shivanna.

References

External links 

2010s Kannada-language films
2019 action thriller films
2019 directorial debut films
2019 films
Films about blind people in India
Films shot in Bangalore
Films shot in Mysore
Films shot in Ooty
Indian action thriller films
Kannada remakes of Malayalam films